The Banská Bystrica Region is one of the eight regions of Slovakia. It is the largest region by area, and has a lower population density than any other region. The Banská Bystrica Region was established in 1923; its borders were last adjusted in 1996. Banská Bystrica consists of 514 municipalities, 24 of which have town status. Its administrative center is the eponymous town of Banská Bystrica, which is also the region's largest town. Other important towns are Zvolen and Lučenec.

Geography
It is located in the central part of Slovakia and has an area of 9,455 km2. The region is prevailingly mountainous, with several ranges within the area. The highest of them are the Low Tatras in the north, where the highest point, Ďumbier, is located. Some of the mountain ranges in the west include Kremnica Mountains, Vtáčnik and Štiavnica Mountains. The Javorie and Krupina Plain ranges are located in the centre. The Slovak Ore Mountains are running from the central areas to the east, along with its subdivisions (e.g. Poľana, Veporské vrchy, Muránska planina and Spiš-Gemer Karst). Lower lying areas are located in the south, represented by the Southern Slovak Basin, running along the borders with Hungary. Major rivers are the Hron in the northern half, Ipeľ in the south and centre, Rimava and for short length Slaná in the east. As for administrative division, the region borders Žilina Region in the north, Prešov Region in the north-east, Košice Region in the east, Hungarian Borsod-Abaúj-Zemplén county in the south-east, Nógrád county in the south and Pest county in the south-west, Nitra Region in the west and Trenčín Region in the north-west.

Demographics

The largest towns are Banská Bystrica, Zvolen, Lučenec and Rimavská Sobota. According to the 2014 census, there were 655,359 inhabitants in the region, with a majority of Slovaks (83.7%), but there is a substantial Hungarian minority (11.8%) along the border with Hungary,  as well as smaller minorities of Roma (2.3%) and Czechs (<1%).

Politics

The governor of Banská Bystrica region is Ondrej Lunter  (Independent). He won with 48,5 %. In election 2022 was elected also regional parliament :

Administrative division
The Banská Bystrica Region consists of 13 districts (okresy).

There are 514 municipalities, of which 24 are towns, where the 56% of the region's population live.

See also
Former Zólyom County of the Kingdom of Hungary

Notes

References

External links
 Banskobystrický samosprávny kraj Official website

 
Regions of Slovakia